Trephionus babai, is a species of beetle belonging to the family Carabidae. It is endemic to Japan.

Description
Body length of male is about 9.3 mm, whereas female is 9.8–10.3 mm. Dorsal surface black. Endophallus long oval. No hind wings. Dorso-apical lobe narrowly swollen. Apex of aedeagus rounded.

References

Beetles described in 1878
Platyninae